Kabile Island, Greenwich Island  
 Kableshkov Ridge, Nordenskjöld Coast 
 Kakrina Point, Clarence Island 
 Kaliakra Glacier, Livingston Island 
 Kaliman Island, Livingston Island
 Kalina Point, Oscar II Coast
 Kaliva Range, Danco Coast
 Kalmar Island, Wilhelm Archipelago
 Kalofer Peak, Livingston Island 
 Kalotina Island, Anvers Island 
 Kaloyan Nunatak, Livingston Island 
 Kaloyanov Peak, Oscar II Coast 
 Kamchiya Glacier, Livingston Island 
 Kamenar Point, Davis Coast
 Kamenov Spur, Oscar II Coast
 Kamera Island, Wilhelm Archipelago
 Kamhi Point, Alexander Island
 Kanarata Point, Astrolabe Island
 Kanchov Peak, Loubet Coast
 Kandidiana Ridge, Alexander Island
 Kanitz Nunatak, Trinity Peninsula 
 Kapisturia Cove, Danco Coast
 Kapka Lake, Elephant Island
 Kaprela Island, Trinity Island
 Karasura Glacier, Bastien Range 
 Karavelova Point, Livingston Island  
 Kardam Buttress, Livingston Island  
 Kardzhali Point, Livingston Island 
 Karia Peak, Graham Coast
 Karlovo Peak, Livingston Island  
 Karnare Col, Sentinel Range  
 Karnobat Pass, Livingston Island  
 Karposh Point, Snow Island  
 Kasabova Glacier, Davis Coast
 Kashin Glacier, Fallières Coast 
 Kasilag Pass, Sentinel Range  
 Kaska Lake, Nelson Island
 Kaspichan Point, Greenwich Island  
 Kavarna Cove, Livingston Island  
 Kavlak Peak, Nordenskjöld Coast  
 Kazanlak Peak, Livingston Island  
 Kazichene Cove, Low Island  
 Kenderova Buttress, Graham Coast
 Kereka Island, Biscoe Islands
 Kermen Peninsula, Robert Island  
 Kerseblept Nunatak, Greenwich Island 
 Kesten Point, Oscar II Coast 
 Ketripor Hill, Trinity Island
 Kianida Reef, Rugged Island  
 Kikish Crag, Livingston Island  
 Kilifarevo Island, Aitcho Islands  
 Kipra Gap, Sentinel Range
 Kiten Point, Trinity Peninsula  
 Kladara Beach, Greenwich Island 
 Kladnitsa Peak, Graham Coast
 Kladorub Glacier, Nordenskjöld Coast
 Klamer Island, Wilhelm Archipelago
 Mount Klayn, Bastien Range
 Klenova Peak, Sentinel Range
 Klepalo Hill, Graham Coast
 Kleptuza Glacier, Anvers Island
 Klimash Passage, Greenwich Island  
 Mount Kliment Ohridski, Alexander Island  
 Klisura Peak, Livingston Island
 Klokotnitsa Ridge, Trinity Peninsula
 Knezha Island, Biscoe Islands  
 Kokalyane Point, Rugged Island  
 Kokiche Col, Trinity Peninsula 
 Kokora Glacier, Oscar II Coast 
 Koledari Knoll, Foyn Coast
 Kolobar Nunatak, Trinity Peninsula 
 Kolokita Cove, Alexander Island 
 Kolosh Glacier, Graham Coast
 Kom Glacier, Fallières Coast
 Komini Peak, Livingston Island 
 Komuniga Island, Graham Coast 
 Kondofrey Heights, Trinity Peninsula  
 Kondolov Peak, Brabant Island
 Kondor Island, Nelson Island
 Kongur Glacier, Smith Island 
 Konstantin Buttress, Nordenskjöld Coast 
 Konush Hill, Trinity Peninsula  
 Kopito Ridge, Trinity Peninsula  
 Kopriva Peak, Nordenskjöld Coast  
 Kopsis Glacier, Sentinel Range  
 Koriten Glacier, Graham Coast
 Kormesiy Peak, Greenwich Island
 Kormoran Island, Wilhelm Archipelago
 Kormyansko Saddle, Danco Coast  
 Korsis Island, Snow Island
 Korten Ridge, Davis Coast  
 Kosatka Island, Wilhelm Archipelago
 Koshava Island, Zed Islands 
 Kostenets Saddle, Smith Island
 Kostenurka Island, Wilhelm Archipelago
 Kostilka Island, Wilhelm Archipelago  
 Kostinbrod Pass, Sentinel Range 
 Kostov Island, South Orkney Islands
 Kostur Point, Brabant Island  
 Kotel Gap, Livingston Island  
 Kotev Cove, Two Hummock Island
 Kotis Point, Livingston Island  
 Kotlari Peak, Brabant Island
 Kotrag Nunatak, Greenwich Island  
 Kovach Island, Robert Island
 Kovil Nunatak, Sentinel Range
 Koynare Rocks, Livingston Island
 Kozhuh Peak, Alexander Island  
 Kozloduy Cove, Robert Island  
 Kozma Cove, Desolation Island  
 Mount Kozyak, Liège Island
 Krakra Bluff, Livingston Island 
 Krali Marko Crag, Oscar II Coast 
 Kramolin Cove, Greenwich Island 
 Kran Peninsula, Liège Island 
 Kranevo Point, Tower Island  
 Krapets Glacier, Danco Coast 
 Krasava Point, Graham Coast
 Krastanov Cove, Elephant Island
 Kremena Ice Piedmont, Smith Island  
 Kresna Gully, Livingston Island  
 Kribul Hill, Trinity Peninsula  
 Krichim Peak, Livingston Island  
 Kril Island, Wilhelm Archipelago
 Krivina Bay, Trinity Island  
 Krivodol Glacier, Smith Island 
 Krivus Island, Biscoe Islands 
 Krum Rock, Livingston Island 
 Kruni Cove, Robert Island 
 Krupen Ridge, Oscar II Coast
 Krusha Peak, Sentinel Range  
 Kubadin Point, Smith Island 
 Kuber Peak, Livingston Island  
 Kubrat Knoll, Livingston Island  
 Kudelin Point, Loubet Coast
 Kudoglu Point, Livingston Island
 Kukeri Nunataks, Livingston Island  
 Kuklen Point, Livingston Island  
 Kukuryak Bluff, Trinity Peninsula  
 Kukuzel Cove, Livingston Island
 Kumanovo Peak, Oscar II Coast  
 Kumata Hill, Trinity Peninsula 
 Kunino Point, Oscar II Coast 
 Kurilo Point, Snow Island  
 Kusev Point, Pickwick Island
 Kushla Peak, Sentinel Range 
 Kutela Cove, Clarence Island
 Kutev Peak, Alexander Island
 Kutlovitsa Glacier, Oscar II Coast 
 Kuvikal Point, Krogh Island
 Kuzman Knoll, Livingston Island
 Kuzov Nunatak, Wilhelm Archipelago
 Kyiv Peninsula, Graham Land
 Kyulevcha Nunatak, Oscar II Coast
 Kyustendil Ridge, Nordenskjöld Coast

See also 
 Bulgarian toponyms in Antarctica

External links 
 Bulgarian Antarctic Gazetteer
 SCAR Composite Gazetteer of Antarctica
 Antarctic Digital Database (ADD). Scale 1:250000 topographic map of Antarctica with place-name search.
 L. Ivanov. Bulgarian toponymic presence in Antarctica. Polar Week at the National Museum of Natural History in Sofia, 2–6 December 2019

Bibliography 
 J. Stewart. Antarctica: An Encyclopedia. Jefferson, N.C. and London: McFarland, 2011. 1771 pp.  
 L. Ivanov. Bulgarian Names in Antarctica. Sofia: Manfred Wörner Foundation, 2021. Second edition. 539 pp.  (in Bulgarian)
 G. Bakardzhieva. Bulgarian toponyms in Antarctica. Paisiy Hilendarski University of Plovdiv: Research Papers. Vol. 56, Book 1, Part A, 2018 – Languages and Literature, pp. 104-119 (in Bulgarian)
 L. Ivanov and N. Ivanova. Bulgarian names. In: The World of Antarctica. Generis Publishing, 2022. pp. 114-115. 

Antarctica
 
Bulgarian toponyms in Antarctica
Names of places in Antarctica